The 1940–41 İstanbul Football League season was the 33rd season of the league. Beşiktaş JK won the league for the 5th time.

Season

References

External links

Istanbul Football League seasons
Turkey
2